Resolved sideband cooling is a laser cooling technique allowing cooling of tightly bound atoms and ions beyond the Doppler cooling limit, potentially to their motional ground state. Aside from the curiosity of having a particle at zero point energy, such preparation of a particle in a definite state with high probability (initialization) is an essential part of state manipulation experiments in quantum optics and quantum computing.

Historical notes 

As of the writing of this article, the scheme behind what we refer to as resolved sideband cooling today is attributed to D.J. Wineland and H. Dehmelt, in their article ‘‘Proposed  laser fluorescence spectroscopy on  mono-ion oscillator III (sideband cooling).’’ The clarification is important as at the time of the latter article, the term also designated what we call today Doppler cooling, which was experimentally realized with atomic ion clouds in 1978 by W. Neuhauser  and independently by D.J. Wineland. An experiment that demonstrates resolved sideband cooling unequivocally in its contemporary meaning is that of Diedrich et al. Similarly unequivocal realization with non-Rydberg neutral atoms was demonstrated in 1998 by S. E. Hamann et al. via Raman cooling.

Conceptual description 

Resolved sideband cooling is a laser cooling technique that can be used to cool strongly trapped atoms to the quantum ground state of their motion. The atoms are usually precooled using the Doppler laser cooling. Subsequently, the resolved sideband cooling is used to cool the atoms beyond the Doppler cooling limit.

A cold trapped atom can be treated to a good approximation as a quantum mechanical harmonic oscillator. If the spontaneous decay rate is much smaller than the vibrational frequency of the atom in the trap, the energy levels of the system can be resolved as consisting of internal levels each corresponding to a ladder of vibrational states.

Suppose a two-level atom whose ground state is shown by g and excited state by e. Efficient laser cooling occurs when the frequency of the laser beam is tuned to the red sideband i.e.

,

In this case the atom undergoes the transition

,

where  represents the state of an ion whose internal atomic state is a and the motional state is m.  This process is labeled '1' in the adjacent image.

Subsequent spontaneous emission occurs predominantly at the carrier frequency if the recoil energy of the atom is negligible compared with the vibrational quantum energy i.e.

This process is labeled '2' in the adjacent image.
The average effect of this mechanism is cooling the ion by one vibrational energy level. When these steps are repeated a sufficient number of times  is reached with a high probability.

Theoretical basis 

The core process that provides the cooling assumes a two level system that is well localized compared to the wavelength of the transition (Lamb-Dicke regime), such as a trapped and sufficiently cooled ion or atom. After, modeling the system as a harmonic oscillator interacting with a classical monochromatic electromagnetic field yields (in the rotating wave approximation) the Hamiltonian

with

and where

 is the number operator

 is the frequency spacing of the oscillator

 is the Rabi frequency due to the atom-light interaction

 is the laser detuning from 

 is the laser wave vector

That is, incidentally, the Jaynes-Cummings Hamiltonian used to describe the phenomenon of an atom coupled to a cavity in cavity QED. Three such manifolds are shown in the picture.

If the  transition linewidth  satisfies , a sufficiently narrow laser can be tuned to a red sideband, . This process is depicted by arrow "1" in the picture. In the Lamb-Dicke regime, the spontaneously emitted photon (depicted by arrow "2") will be, on average, at frequency , and the net effect of such a cycle, on average, will be the removing of  motional quanta. More rigorous mathematical treatment is given in Turchette et al. and Wineland et al. Specific treatment of cooling multiple ions can be found in Morigi et al. An insightful approach to the details of cooling is given in Eschner et al., and was selectively followed above.

Experimental implementations 

For resolved sideband cooling to be effective, the process needs to start at sufficiently low . To that end, the particle is usually first cooled to the Doppler limit, then some sideband cooling cycles are applied, and finally, a measurement is taken or state manipulation is carried out. A more or less direct application of this scheme was demonstrated by Diedrich et al. with the caveat that the narrow quadrupole transition used for cooling connects the ground state to a long-lived state, and the latter had to be pumped out to achieve optimal cooling efficiency. It is not uncommon, however, that additional steps are needed in the process, due to the atomic structure of the cooled species. Examples of that are the cooling of  ions and the Raman sideband cooling of  atoms.

Example: cooling of  ions 

The energy levels relevant to the cooling scheme for  ions are the S1/2, P1/2, P3/2, D3/2, and D5/2, which are additionally split by a static magnetic field to their Zeeman manifolds. Doppler cooling is applied on the dipole S1/2 - P1/2 transition (397 nm), however, there is about 6% probability of spontaneous decay to the long-lived D3/2 state, so that state is simultaneously pumped out (at 866 nm) to improve Doppler cooling. Sideband cooling is performed on the narrow quadrupole transition S1/2 - D5/2 (729 nm), however, the long-lived D5/2 state needs to be pumped out to the short lived P3/2 state (at 854 nm) to recycle the ion to the ground S1/2 state and maintain cooling performance. One possible implementation was carried out by Leibfried et al. and a similar one is detailed by Roos. For each data point in the 729 nm absorption spectrum, a few hundred iterations of the following are executed:
 the ion is Doppler cooled with 397 nm and 866 nm light, with 854 nm light on as well
 the ion is spin polarized to the S1/2(m=-1/2) state by applying a  397 nm light for the last few moments of the Doppler cooling process
 sideband cooling loops are applied at the first red sideband of the D5/2(m=-5/2) 729 nm transition
 to ensure the population ends up in the S1/2(m=-1/2) state, another  397 nm pulse is applied
 manipulation is carried out and analysis is carried out by applying 729 nm light at the frequency of interest
 detection is carried out with 397 nm and 866 nm light: discrimination between dark (D) and bright (S) state is based on a pre-determined threshold value of fluorescence counts
Variations of this scheme relaxing the requirements or improving the results are being investigated/used by several ion-trapping groups.

Example: Raman sideband cooling of  atoms 

A Raman transition replaces the one-photon transition used in the sideband above by a two-photon process via a virtual level. In the  cooling experiment carried out by Hamann et al., trapping is provided by an isotropic optical lattice in a magnetic field, which also provides Raman coupling to the red sideband of the Zeeman manifolds.
 preparation of cold sample of   atoms is carried out in optical molasses, in a magneto-optic trap
 atoms are allowed to occupy a 2D, near resonance lattice
 the lattice is changed adiabatically to a far off resonance lattice, which leaves the sample sufficiently well cooled for sideband cooling to be effective (Lamb-Dicke regime)
 a magnetic field is turned on to tune the Raman coupling to the red motional sideband
 relaxation between the hyperfine states is provided by a pump/repump laser pair 
 after some time, pumping is intensified to transfer the population to a specific hyperfine state
 lattice is turned off and time of flight techniques are employed to perform Stern-Gerlach analysis

See also
 Laser cooling
 Amplitude modulation

References 

Laser applications
Cooling technology
Atomic physics
Plasma physics